Kiss Daddy Goodbye, also known as Revenge of the Zombie, is a 1981 American horror film directed by Patrick Regan. The film stars Fabian, Marilyn Burns, Jon Cedar, and Marvin Miller. It is about two psychic children who avenge the death of their father.

Plot
Two children who have psychic powers use them to avenge the death of their father, who was murdered by a biker gang.

Cast
 Fabian as Deputy Blanchard
 Marilyn Burns as Nora Dennis
 Jon Cedar as Wally Stanton 
 Marvin Miller as Bill Morris
 Chester Grimes as biker gang leader 
 Jed Mills as biker
 Gay French as Nicky - female biker
 Robert Dryer as Billy

References

External links

1981 films
American horror films
1981 horror films
1980s English-language films
1980s American films
English-language horror films